The 1989 Speedway World Pairs Championship was the twentieth FIM Speedway World Pairs Championship. The final took place in Leszno, Poland. The championship was won by Denmark (48 points) who beat Sweden (44 points) and England (37 points).

World final
  Leszno, Alfred Smoczyk Stadium

See also
 1989 Individual Speedway World Championship
 1989 Speedway World Team Cup
 motorcycle speedway
 1989 in sports

References

1989
World Pairs
Speedway World Pairs